Tilt-a-Whirl is a book written by Chris Grabenstein and published by Carroll & Graf on 20 September 2005, which later went on to win the Anthony Award for Best First Mystery in 2006.

References 

Anthony Award-winning works
American mystery novels
2005 American novels
Carroll & Graf books